Judy Munsen (born February 23, 1949) is a composer for several popular television programs during the mid-1970s. Notably, Munsen succeeded Vince Guaraldi after his untimely death in February 1976, working alongside Ed Bogas, composing music for several Peanuts specials between 1977 and 1992 as well as the film Bon Voyage, Charlie Brown (and Don't Come Back!!).

Works
Her works include:

References

External links

1949 births
Living people
20th-century composers